Crowley is a surname, which was traditionally pronounced  in English but is now often pronounced  .

In Ireland, the name was first found in Moylurg, in County Roscommon, where it started as a branch of the MacDermots. It is from Teige, a Prince of Moylurg, down to Cruadhlaoch that the line of descent for the Crowleys begins. A junior branch of the Crowley family also emerged and moved to the area of Dunmanway, in the west of County Cork. They eventually became a distinct sept with their chief at Kilshallow, thriving while their family of origin gradually decreased in number. The majority of the Crowley family came from the county of Cork, with three-quarters of the family originating from there.

The Irish O Cruadhlaoich or Ua Cruadhlaoich, a Gaelic name meaning "descendant of the hard hero" or "descendant of the hardy warrior", was anglicised to "Crowley" or "O'Crowley".

People with the surname
Aleister Crowley (1875–1947), English occultist
Ambrose Crowley (1658–1713), English industrialist of the late 17th and early 18th centuries
Amelia Crowley (fl. 1995–), Irish actress
Ann Crowley (singer) (born 1929), American singer and actress)
Benjamin Crowley, namesake of Crowley's Ridge in Arkansas (–1842)
Bill Crowley (baseball) (1857–1891), American baseball player
Bob Crowley (born 1952), Irish theatre director
Brian Crowley (born 1964), Irish MEP
Brian Lee Crowley, Canadian politician
Candy Crowley (born 1948), American news anchor, political correspondent for the CNN television network
Carrie Crowley (born 1964), Irish actress
Cheree Crowley (born 1988), New Zealander professional wrestler, better known as Dakota Kai
Clive Crowley (1890–1918), Australian grazier and soldier
Daniel Crowley (disambiguation), several people
Darren Crowley (born 1987), Irish hurler
David Crowley (Ohio politician) (1937–2011), Cincinnati City Council member
David Crowley (Wisconsin politician) (born 1986), Wisconsin State Assembly member
Dennis Crowley (born 1976), American internet entrepreneur
Dermot Crowley (born 1947), Irish actor
Elizabeth Crowley (born 1977), American politician
Elizabeth Crowley (Rhode Island politician) (born 1951), American politician
Evin Crowley (born 1945), Northern Irish actress
Flor Crowley (1934–1977), Teachta Dála from West Cork
Francis Crowley (1912–1932), American murderer and career criminal
Frank Crowley (athlete) (1909–1980), American middle- and long-distance runner
Frank Crowley (politician) (born 1939), Teachta Dála from Cork North West
Frederick Crowley (1890–1945), Teachta Dála for Kerry South
Gary Crowley (born 1961), British broadcaster, TV presenter and DJ
Grace Crowley (1890–1979), Australian artist
Herbert Crowley (1873–1937), British painter and cartoonist
Honor Crowley (1903–1966), Teachta Dála for Kerry South
J.C. Crowley (born 1947), American musician
James Crowley (athlete), Irish American Athletic Club distance runner
James Crowley, police officer in Cambridge, Massachusetts
James Crowley (politician) (1880–1946), Irish nationalist politician
Jeananne Crowley (born 1949), Irish-born actress and writer
Jeremiah Crowley (politician) (1832–1901), in Massachusetts
Jeremiah J. Crowley (1861–1927), American religious leader and writer
Jim Crowley (1902–1986), American college football player
Jimmy Crowley, Irish folk musician
Joe Crowley (television presenter), British television presenter
Joe Crowley (born 1962), American politician
Joseph Robert Crowley (1915–2003), American Catholic bishop
John Francis Crowley (1891–1942), Irish revolutionary and longest hunger striker in history
John Crowley (disambiguation), several people
Johnny Crowley (born 1956), Irish hurling player
Johnny Crowley (Gaelic footballer), Irish footballer
Joseph Crowley (disambiguation), several people
Kacy Crowley, American musician
Kathleen Crowley (1929–2017), Miss America contestant and actress
Kieran Crowley (born 1961), New Zealand Rugby player
Leo Crowley (1889–1972), cabinet member of American President Franklin D. Roosevelt
Margaret Crowley (speed skater) (born 1986), American speed skater
Margaret Crowley (athlete) (born 1967), Australian runner
Mart Crowley (1935–2020), American playwright
Mary Catherine Crowley (1856–1920; pen name, "Janet Grant"), American writer
Matthias F. Cowley (1858–1940), American apostle of the LDS Church
Michael Crowley (disambiguation), several people
Mike Crowley (born 1975), American ice hockey player
Miles Crowley (1859–1921), member of the US Congress (1879–1883) from Texas
Monica Crowley (born 1968), American radio commentator
Nathan Crowley, British film production designer
Noel Crowley (born 1962), Irish hurling player
Pádraig Crowley (born 1957), Irish hurling player
Pat Crowley (born 1933), American actress
Pat Crowley (rugby union) (1293–1981), New Zealander rugby union player
Paul Crowley (footballer) (born 1980), Irish footballer
Paul F. Crowley (born 1934), Pennsylvania House of Representatives member
Peter William Crowley (1900–1963), Irish revolutionary and longest hunger striker in history
Philip Crowley (disambiguation), several people
Richard Crowley (1836–1908), member of the US Congress (1895–1897) from New York
Robert Crowley (disambiguation), several people
Rodney R. Crowley (1836–1913), New York lawyer and politician
Roger Crowley (born 1951), British author
Rosemary Crowley (born 1938), Labor Senator for South Australia
Ryan Crowley (born 1984), Australian footballer
Stephen Crowley (cricketer) (born 1961), English cricketer
Steve Crowley, American Marine killed during the siege of the U.S. Embassy in Pakistan
Tadhg Crowley (1890–1969), Irish politician from Limerick
Tadhgo Crowley (1921–1963), Gaelic football player
Ted Crowley (born 1970), American ice hockey player
Terry Crowley (born 1947), American baseball coach
Terry Crowley (linguist) (1953–2005), British-Australian linguist specializing in Oceanic languages
Thomas Crowley (disambiguation), several people
Timothy Crowley (1847–1921), Irish revolutionary
Tim Crowley (born 1952), Irish sportsperson
Walt Crowley (1947–2007), Washington State community leader
Irene Craigmile Bolam née O'Crowley (1904–1982), falsely accused of being Amelia Earhart

Fictional characters
 Anthony Crowley, a demon in the novel Good Omens
 Father Crowley, catholic priest in TV comedy-drama Desperate Housewives
 Fran Crowley, in TV sitcom Mama's Family
 Terry Crowley (The Shield), in TV drama The Shield
 Victor Crowley, in 2006 film Hatchet
 Crowley, in TV drama series Supernatural
 Crowley, in TV drama series The Walking Dead
 Crowley, played by Eugene Levy in the 1992 movie Stay Tuned
 Crowley, in John Flanagan's Ranger's Apprentice

See also
Crowley (disambiguation)
Crawley (surname)

References

External links

The Crowley Clan
Crowley Clan DNA Project

Surnames
Irish families
English-language surnames
Surnames of Irish origin
Surnames of English origin